The 2013 VFF National Super League was the qualifying competition for the 2013–14 OFC Champions League.

Tafea FC and Amicale FC both advanced to this tournament as the two Vanuatu representative clubs.

Teams
12 teams will qualify from 8 separate national competitions.

Rounds

Northern Region
Uripiv FC advanced in first place and Siaraga FC advanced in second place.

Round 1

Round 2

Round 3

Round 4

Southern Region
Amicale F.C. advanced in first place and Tafea F.C. advanced in second place.

Round 1

Round 2

Round 3

Round 4

Playoffs

Semi-finals

Grand Final

References

2012–13 in Vanuatuan football
VFF National Super League seasons
Vanu